The following is a partial list of German ambassadors to Afghanistan.

Unified Germany (1870–1945)
 Werner Otto von Hentig, 1916–1917 (legation leader)
 Fritz Grobba, from 1923–1926
 , 1926–1929
 , 1929
 , 1931–1933
 Kurt Max Paul Ziemke, 1933–1936
 , 1937–1945

East Germany (1945–1990)
The German Democratic Republic first sent an ambassador to Kabul  17 January 1973.  The German Democratic ceased to exist in 1990, however.
 , 1973–1976
 , 1976–1978
 , 1979–1981
 Kurt Krüger, 1982–1986
 , 1986–1989
 Horst Lindner, 1989–1990

West Germany (1945–1990)
 , 1954–1956
 , 1957–1959
 , 1959–1963
 , 1963–1969
 , 1969–1973
 Franz Josef Hoffmann, 1973–1979
 Karl-Heinrich Berninger, 1979–1982

Unified Germany (1990–present)
 , 2001–2004
 , 2004–2006
 , 2006–2008
 , 2008–2010
 Rüdiger König, 2010–2013
 , 2013-2014
 , 2014-2016
 , 2016-2018
 , 2018-2020
 , 2020–2021

References

Afghanistan
 
Germany